The Chamber is a 2016 survival film about four people trapped in a submersible at the bottom of the ocean. The film is directed by Ben Parker in his directorial debut, and it stars Johannes Bah Kuhnke, Charlotte Salt, James McArdle, and Elliot Levey.

Cast

 Johannes Bah Kuhnke as Mats
 Charlotte Salt as Red
 James McArdle as Parks
 Elliot Levey as Denholm
 Christian Hillborg as Andy
 David Horovitch as the captain

Drone
Director Ben Parker said of the drone's inclusion, "A drone that crashed in the ocean was where the kernel of the story came from. I’ve always been fascinated, or rather terrified, by drones... The disconnect of using unmanned aircraft for attacks is something that scares me. And The Chamber was really about all my darkest fears rolled into one, so I wanted the plot to revolve around the recovery of one of these drones."

Critical reception
Review aggregator website Rotten Tomatoes reported an approval rating of 33% based on 15 reviews.  Metacritic gave the film a weighted average score of 40 out of 100, based on 5 critics, indicating "mixed or average reviews".

See also
Submarine films
List of films featuring drones

References

External links

2010s survival films